Kake Airport  is a state-owned public-use airport located one nautical mile (2 km) southeast of the central business district of Kake,  a city in the Petersburg Borough of the U.S. state of Alaska. This airport is included in the National Plan of Integrated Airport Systems for 2011–2015, which categorized it as a general aviation airport.

Scheduled airline service is available at Kake Seaplane Base (IATA: KAE, FAA LID: KAE).

Facilities and aircraft 
Kake Airport has one runway designated 11/29 with an asphalt surface measuring 4,000 by 100 feet (1,219 x 30 m). For the 12-month period ending December 31, 2006, the airport had 4,600 aircraft operations, an average of 12 per day.

See also 
 Kake Seaplane Base
 List of airports in Alaska

References

External links 
 FAA Alaska airport diagram for Kake Airport (AFE) (GIF)
 FAA Alaska airport diagram for Kake Seaplane Base (KAE) (GIF)

Airports in Petersburg Borough, Alaska